Apacheta (Aymara for the place of transit of an important pass in the principal routes of the Andes; name for a stone cairn in the Andes, a little pile of rocks built along the trail in the high mountains, also spelled Apacheta) is a  mountain in the Andes of Peru. It is located in the Puno Region, Carabaya Province, Crucero District. Apachita lies west of the peaks of Ariquma, north of Ariquma Lake and northeast of Wiluyuq Qucha and the peak of Wiluyuq Urqu.

References 

Mountains of Puno Region
Mountains of Peru